Jean Picard (21 July 1620 – 12 July 1682) was a French astronomer and priest born in La Flèche, where he studied at the Jesuit Collège Royal Henry-Le-Grand.

He is principally notable for his accurate measure of the size of the Earth, based on a careful survey of one degree of latitude along the Paris Meridian.

Geodesy
Picard was the first person to measure the size of the Earth to a reasonable degree of accuracy in an arc measurement survey conducted in 1669–70, for which he is honored with a pyramid at Juvisy-sur-Orge. Guided by Maurolycus's methodology and Snellius's mathematics for doing so, Picard achieved this by measuring one degree of latitude along the Paris Meridian using triangulation along thirteen triangles stretching from Paris to the clocktower of Sourdon, near Amiens.

His measurements produced a result of 110.46 km for one degree of latitude, which gives a corresponding terrestrial radius of 6328.9 km. Isaac Newton was to use this value in his theory of universal gravitation.

The polar radius has now been measured at just over 6357 km. This was an error only 0.44% less than the modern value. This was another example of advances in astronomy and its tools making possible advances in cartography.

Instruments

Picard was the first to attach a telescope with crosswires (developed by William Gascoigne) to a quadrant, and one of the first to use a micrometer screw on his instruments. The quadrant he used to determine the size of the Earth had a radius of 38 inches and was graduated to quarter-minutes. The sextant he used to find the meridian had a radius of six feet, and was equipped with a micrometer to enable minute adjustments. These equipment improvements made the margin of error only ten seconds, as opposed to Tycho Brahe's four minutes of error. This made his measurements 24 times as accurate.

Other work
In 1670–71, Picard travelled to the site of Tycho Brahe's Danish observatory, Uraniborg, in order to assess its longitude accurately so that Tycho's readings could be compared to others.

Picard collaborated and corresponded with many scientists, including Isaac Newton, Christiaan Huygens, Ole Rømer, Rasmus Bartholin, Johann Hudde, and even his main competitor, Giovanni Cassini, although Cassini was often less than willing to return the gesture. These correspondences led to Picard's contributions to areas of science outside the field of geodesy, such as the aberration of light he observed while he was in Uraniborg, or his discovery of mercurial phosphorescence upon his observance of the faint glowing of a barometer. This discovery led to Newton's studies of light's visible spectrum.

Picard also developed what became the standard method for measuring the right ascension of a celestial object. In this method, the observer records the time at which the object crosses the observer's meridian. Picard made his observations using the precision pendulum clock that Dutch physicist Christiaan Huygens had recently developed.

Legacy
 His book "Mesure de la Terre" was published in 1671.
 There is a lunar crater named after Picard, on the southwest quadrant of Mare Crisium. 
 The PICARD mission, an orbiting solar observatory, is named after Picard.

Works

See also
 List of Roman Catholic scientist-clerics
 Meridian arc
Seconds pendulum

Notes

External links

 А.А.Гурштейн "Звезды Парижа" 2016. 
Digital exhibition about Jean Picard (in French) / Observatoire de Paris

1620 births
1682 deaths
17th-century French astronomers
French geodesists
Members of the French Academy of Sciences
Catholic clergy scientists
People from La Flèche